Federal Route 53, or Jalan Seremban–Port Dickson, is a federal road in Negeri Sembilan, Malaysia, connecting Seremban to Port Dickson. The 33.2 km (20.6 mi) Federal Route 53 became the backbone of the road system linking Seremban to Port Dickson before being surpassed by the Seremban–Port Dickson Highway (E29) in 1998.

The Kilometre Zero of the Federal Route 53 is located at Port Dickson, at its interchange with the Federal Route 5, the main trunk road of the west coast of Peninsular Malaysia. The Kilometre Zero monument is erected near Pos Malaysia post office at Jalan Baharu, Port Dickson.

History
By the 1990s to 2000s, the road was bogged down with severe congestion, and the present Seremban–Port Dickson Highway was built to replace it.

Features
 Dangerous corners along the route.

At most sections, the Federal Route 53 was built under the JKR R5 road standard, with a speed limit of 90 km/h.

There is one overlap: Port Dickson–Lukut (overlaps with Federal Route 5).

List of junctions and towns

References

053
Sepang District
Roads in Selangor
Transport in Negeri Sembilan